Brotton railway station was opened by the Cleveland Railway on 1 November 1875, and served the village of Brotton in North Yorkshire, England.

It was built to the designs of the architect William Peachey.

It closed on 2 May 1960.

References

External links

 Brotton station on navigable 1955 O. S. map
 Brotton station on Subterranea Britannica

Disused railway stations in Redcar and Cleveland
Former North Eastern Railway (UK) stations
Railway stations in Great Britain opened in 1875
Railway stations in Great Britain closed in 1960
William Peachey railway stations